Dean Robert Blackwell (born 5 December 1969) is an English former footballer who played as a defender. He appeared in the Premier League and the Football League for Wimbledon, and the Football League for Plymouth Argyle and Brighton & Hove Albion.

Career
He spent 14 seasons with Wimbledon, turning professional just after their famous FA Cup triumph in 1988, and bounced back to form in the 1996-97 season after two years out of action due to injuries, being a regular member of the first team as Wimbledon finished eighth in the FA Premier League and were semi-finalists in the FA Cup and Football League Cup. He was still with Wimbledon when they were relegated in 2000, and spent two seasons with them in Division One before leaving in 2002 to sign for Brighton. In his first season with the Seagulls, they were relegated from Division One, but were promoted from Division Two in his second season as playoff winners. Blackwell then retired from playing.

Early in his Wimbledon career, Blackwell was loaned to Plymouth Argyle, and was capped six times at under-21 level for the England team. Blackwell made 233 League appearances, scoring three goals, and represented England at under-21 level.

Career statistics
Source:

References

External links

1969 births
Living people
English footballers
England under-21 international footballers
Association football defenders
Wimbledon F.C. players
Plymouth Argyle F.C. players
Brighton & Hove Albion F.C. players
English Football League players
Premier League players